2001 El Salvador earthquake may refer to:
 January 2001 El Salvador earthquake (7.7 Mw), struck 60 miles (100 km) southwest of San Miguel
 February 2001 El Salvador earthquake (6.6 Mw), struck 15 miles (30 km) east of San Salvador

See also 
 List of earthquakes in 2001
 List of earthquakes in El Salvador